The Ancient South Arabian script (modern  ) branched from the Proto-Sinaitic script in about the late 2nd millennium BCE. It was used for writing the Old South Arabian languages Sabaic, Qatabanic, Hadramautic, Minaean, and Hasaitic, and the Ethiopic language Ge'ez in Dʿmt. The earliest instances of the Ancient South Arabian script are painted pottery sherds from Raybun in Hadhramaut in Yemen, which are dated to the late 2nd millennium BCE. There are no letters for vowels, which are marked by matres lectionis.

Its mature form was reached around 800 BCE, and its use continued until the 6th century CE, including Ancient North Arabian inscriptions in variants of the alphabet, when it was displaced by the Arabic alphabet. In Ethiopia and Eritrea, it evolved later into the Ge'ez script, which, with added symbols throughout the centuries, has been used to write Amharic, Tigrinya and Tigre, as well as other languages (including various Semitic, Cushitic, and Nilo-Saharan languages).

Properties
 It is usually written from right to left but can also be written from left to right. When written from left to right the characters are flipped horizontally (see the photo).
 The spacing or separation between words is done with a vertical bar mark (|).
 Letters in words are not connected together.
 It does not implement any diacritical marks (dots, etc.), differing in this respect from the modern Arabic alphabet.

Letters

Numbers

Six signs are used for numbers:

The sign for 50 was evidently created by removing the lower triangle from the sign for 100. The sign for 1 doubles as a word separator.  The other four signs double as both letters and numbers.  Each of these four signs is the first letter of the name of the corresponding numeral.

An additional sign is used to bracket numbers, setting them apart from surrounding text.  For example, 

These signs are used in an additive system similar to Roman numerals to represent any number (excluding zero).  Two examples:
 17 is written as 1 + 1 + 5 + 10: 
 99 is written as 1 + 1 + 1 + 1 + 5 + 10 + 10 + 10 + 10 + 50: 

Thousands are written two different ways:
 Smaller values are written using just the 1000 sign.  For example, 8,000 is written as 1000 × 8: 
 Larger values are written by promoting the signs for 10, 50, and 100 to 10,000, 50,000, and 100,000 respectively:
 31,000 is written as 1000 + 10,000 × 3:  (easily confused with 1,030)
 40,000 is written as 10,000 × 4:  (easily confused with 40)
 253,000 is written as 2 × 100.000 + 50.000 + 3 × 1000:  (easily confused with 3,250)
Perhaps because of ambiguity, numerals, at least in monumental inscriptions, are always clarified with the numbers written out in words.

Zabūr

Zabūr, also known as "South Arabian minuscules", is the name of the cursive form of the South Arabian script that was used by the Sabaeans in addition to their monumental script, or Musnad.

Zabur was a writing system in ancient Yemen along with Musnad. The difference between the two is that Musnad documented historical events, meanwhile Zabur writings were used for religious scripts or to record daily transactions among ancient Yemenis. Zabur writings could be found in palimpsest form written on papyri or palm-leaf stalks.

Unicode

The South Arabian alphabet was added to the Unicode Standard in October, 2009 with the release of version 5.2.

The Unicode block, called Old South Arabian, is U+10A60–U+10A7F.

Note that U+10A7D OLD SOUTH ARABIAN NUMBER ONE (𐩽) represents both the numeral one and a word divider.

Gallery
 Photos from National Museum of Yemen:

 Photos from Yemen Military Museum:

 Photo from the British Museum

See also 
 Ancient North Arabian script
 Arabist and archeologist Eduard Glaser
 Geographer Carl Rathjens

References

Citations

References

External links
Smithsonian National Museum of Natural History
Omniglot's entry on South Arabian
Carved, Signed, Crossed Out – Documents on Wooden Sticks from Ancient South Arabia - Peter Stein - ANE Today - Oct 2022

Abjad writing systems
Ancient history of Yemen
Obsolete writing systems
Semitic writing systems
Proto-Sinaitic script
Right-to-left writing systems
South Arabia